The 2009–10 Abu Dhabi 1st GP2 Asia round was the first round of the 2009–10 GP2 Asia Series season. It was held on October 31 and November 1, 2009 at Yas Marina Circuit in Abu Dhabi, United Arab Emirates. The race was used as a support race to the day/night 2009 Abu Dhabi Grand Prix. It was the first of two rounds to be held at the circuit, the other will be the 2009–10 Abu Dhabi 2nd GP2 Asia round. The round was the only one held in 2009, the rest being held in 2010.

Report

Feature race 
The first race looked like it was dominated by Davide Valsecchi, who took pole, won race and got fastest lap, but he lost the lead at the start when Valsecchi was beaten off the line by GP2 debutant Sam Bird, Valsecchi managed to re-pass him going down the long back straight to turn 8. Bird was also passed by GP2 Asia returnee James Jakes and GP2 veteran Luca Filippi. Filippi found enough pace to not only pass Jakes for second, but also jump ahead of Valsecchi after the mandatory pit stops. A crash between Luiz Razia and Christian Vietoris made the safety car appear and this allowed Valsecchi to close the gap between himself and Filippi. Valsecchi put pressure on Filippi later in the race and finally won the lead battle by muscling through after a very close side by side dice through the Turn 11, 12, 13 and 14 complex. He briefly came under threat when Trident driver Plamen Kralev's spin prompted the safety car again, but had the pace to pull away and secure the win. Filippi managed to fend off Jakes to retain second place, with Alexander Rossi the top rookie in fourth place, followed by fellow newcomers Josef Král and Vietoris. Rossi and Král's former International Formula Master rival Fabio Leimer was unable to capitalise on his excellent third on the grid as his Ocean Racing Technology car stalled before the formation lap. Fifth place qualifier Roldán Rodríguez left another gap when he failed to get off the line at the start. Bird had been on course for fourth until he retired on the penultimate lap with brake problems, which meant his countryman and fellow GP2 debutant Oliver Turvey moved up to eighth in the second iSport car and would therefore start from reverse grid pole for the sprint race, alongside Johnny Cecotto Jr. of Trident Racing.

Sprint race 
For the sprint race, Turvey started on pole, having finished eighth in the feature race. He got off the line slowly and DAMS driver Vietoris burst through from third to the lead at the start, Turvey falling back to fourth behind Král and Rossi into the first corner. Turvey's front row partner Cecotto, Jr. also fell down the order, to seventh behind the feature race top duo Filippi and Valsecchi. Valsecchi was a man determined to get big points, and after a few side by side tussles, managed to pass Filippi. With the momentum, Valsecchi also managed to pass his team-mate Turvey after Filippi had spun trying to avoid Cecotto. The safety car then gave Valsecchi a chance to catch up with the top three, the yellow being required after Will Bratt's Coloni machine had snapped into a high-speed spin at the end of the back straight and collected Leimer on its way to the barrier. Vietoris and Král had pulled comfortably clear of the field before the safety car, with the DAMS driver edging away early on before Král closed back onto his tail at half-distance. But the safety car cost them their cushion, for Valsecchi swiftly muscled past Rossi for third after the restart and then rapidly closed on Vietoris and Král. That gave Vietoris some breathing space, as Valsecchi climbed all over the back of Král before diving ahead into Turn 11 on the last lap. There was no time left to catch Vietoris though, and the German duly ended his first GP2 weekend with victory. Turvey put a late move on Rossi to take fourth, with Cecotto hanging on to sixth ahead of Vietoris' team-mate Edoardo Piscopo and the delayed Filippi. Jakes was forced wide at the first corner and could only finish 10th, the Super Nova driver having spent most of the race trying in vain to pass DPR's Michael Herck.

Classification

Qualifying

Race 1

Race 2

References

Yas Marina Circuit GP2 Asia Series round
GP2 Asia Series